Mērdzene Parish is an administrative unit of Ludza Municipality in the Latgale region of Latvia.

Towns, villages and settlements of Mērdzene Parish 
  – parish administrative center.

References 

Parishes of Latvia
Ludza Municipality
Latgale